The Australian Law Reform Commission (often abbreviated to ALRC) is an Australian independent statutory body established to conduct reviews into the law of Australia. The reviews, also called inquiries or references, are referred to the ALRC by the Attorney-General for Australia.  Based on its research and consultations throughout an inquiry, the ALRC makes recommendations to government so that government can make informed decisions about law reform.

The ALRC is part of the Attorney-General's portfolio; however it is an independent statutory authority constituted under the Australian Law Reform Commission Act 1996 (Cth), and the Public Governance, Performance and Accountability Act 2013 (PGPA Act). As an independent agency, it is able to undertake research, consultations and legal policy development, and to make recommendations to the Parliament, without fear or favour.

The ALRC's objective is to make recommendations for law reform that:
    
 bring the law into line with current conditions and needs
     remove defects in the law
     simplify the law
     adopt new or more effective methods for administering the law and dispensing justice, and
     provide improved access to justice.

When conducting an inquiry, the ALRC also monitors foreign legal systems to ensure Australia compares favourably with international best practice.

The ALRC aims to ensure that the proposals and recommendations it makes do not trespass unduly on personal rights and liberties of citizens, or make those rights and liberties unduly dependent on administrative, rather than judicial, decisions and, as far as practicable, are consistent with the International Covenant on Civil and Political Rights.

The ALRC must also have regard to any effect that its recommendations may have on the costs of access to, and dispensing of, justice.

Background
The ALRC is the primary law reform agency for the Australian government. It has its origins in the Law Reform Commission, which was established in 1975 under the Law Reform Commission Act 1973. This legislation was superseded by the Australian Law Reform Commission Act 1996 (Cth) (the ALRC Act) which came into effect on 11 November 1996. The new act was intended to improve the structure and functions of the ALRC, consistent with the recommendations of the 1994 Report of the House of Representatives Standing Committee on Legal and Constitutional Affairs titled, Law Reform—the Challenge Continues.

Constitution
Under the amendments to the ALRC Act in 2012, the Commission consists of a President and up to 6 other members. The performance of the Commission’s functions, and the exercise of its powers, are not affected merely because of 1 or more vacancies in its membership. The Attorney‑General may, from time to time, appoint such other part‑time members of the Commission as the Attorney‑General considers necessary to enable the Commission to perform its functions. Full-time members are to be appointed by the Governor‑General and part-time members are to be appointed by the Attorney-General.  A member holds office for the term (of at least 6 months but not longer than 5 years) specified in his or her appointment, but is eligible for re‑appointment.

Presidents
 Michael Kirby, Chair, 1975-1984
 Murray Wilcox, Chair, 1984-1985
 Xavier Connor, Chair, 1985-1987
 Elizabeth Evatt, Chair, 1988-1993
 Alan Rose, President, 1994-1999
 David Weisbrot, President, 1999-2009
 Rosalind Croucher, President, 2009-2017
 Robert Cornall, Acting President, 2017–2018
 Sarah Derrington, President, 10 January 2018 – present

Law reform process
The process for each law reform project may differ according to the scope of inquiry, and the ALRC usually works within a particular framework when it develops recommendations for reform.  An Inquiry begins with Terms of Reference delivered by the Australian Attorney-General identifying an area of law that needs to be reviewed for various reasons including:
 there is community concern about a particular issue that needs to be addressed through the process of law reform
 recent events or legal cases have highlighted a deficiency with the law
 scientific or technological developments have made it necessary to update the law or create new laws.
An Issues Paper is usually the first official publication of an inquiry. It provides a preliminary look at issues surrounding the inquiry.  It serves to educate the community about the range of the problems under consideration.
Discussion Papers provide a detailed account of ALRC research, including a summary of the various consultations and submissions undertaken and received, and set out draft proposals for reform. 
The ALRC makes a formal call for submissions whenever it releases an Issues Paper or Discussion Paper. Through the submissions it receives, the ALRC can gauge what people think about current laws, how they should be changed and can test its proposals for reform with stakeholders before finalising them.
ALRC Final Reports make specific recommendations for changes to the law or legal processes. In formulating recommendations, the ALRC draws not only on submissions, but also face to face consultations, academic and industry research, international research and models, and its considerable experience in law reform. The ALRC seeks to consult with people who have expertise and experience in the laws under review, as well as people likely to be affected by the laws in question.
During the process of formulating recommendations, the ALRC has regard to any policy aims expressed in terms of Reference and the principles for reform identified for each particular inquiry, against which possible proposals are assessed.
The Attorney-General is required to table the Final Report in Parliament within 15 sitting days of receiving it, after which it can be made available to the public.
The Australian Government decides whether to implement the recommendations, in whole or in part.

Inquiries into the ALRC
Throughout the history of the ALRC there have been a number of inquiries into its role, constitution and functions. They include:
 1977-1979 Senate Standing Committee on Legal and Constitutional Affairs inquiry into the processing of law reform proposals.
 1993-1994 House of Representatives Standing Committee on Legal and Constitutional Affairs. This was the first review of the Commission’s performance, structure and overall method of operation.
 1997-1998 - Possible Improper Interference with a Potential Witness Before the Parliamentary Joint Committee on Native Title and the Aboriginal and Torres Strait Islander Land Fund (73rd Report)
 2010 - Legal and Constitutional Affairs Committees an Inquiry into the role and governance of the ALRC and the adequacy of its staffing and resources.

See also

New South Wales Law Reform Commission
 Victorian Law Reform Commission

Notes

External links
Law Reform Commission Act 1973 - http://www.comlaw.gov.au/comlaw/management.nsf/lookupindexpagesbyid/IP200402275?OpenDocument
 Australian Law Reform Commission
 Victorian Law Reform Commission
 Australian Law Reform Commission Act 1996 (Comm) http://www.austlii.edu.au/au/legis/cth/consol_act/alrca1996348/index.html.

Commonwealth Government agencies of Australia
Law commissions
Legal organisations based in Australia
1996 establishments in Australia
Government agencies established in 1996
Law reform in Australia